Elías Querejeta Gárate (27 October 1934 – 9 June 2013), also known as Elías Querejeta and known in the Spanish film industry as "The Producer", was a Spanish screenwriter and film producer. He is the father of Gracia Querejeta.

Biography
Querejeta was born in Hernani, Spain, and played soccer for Real Sociedad. By the age of 18 he was making his debut in the Spanish first division with San Sebastián's team, Real Sociedad (his position was midfielder; his brother José María also played, as a goalkeeper). But his career in sports ended in 1959, when he moved to Madrid to set up his own film production company.

He produced some of the best-known Spanish films of the 1960s and 1970s and most notably worked with Carlos Saura (13 films), Víctor Erice (2 films),  Montxo Armendáriz (4 times) and Fernando León de Aranoa (3 films).

He produced Mr. Saura's La Prima Angélica (1973) and Cría Cuervos (1975), which won special jury prizes at the 1973 and 1975 at the special prize of the jury at the Cannes Film Festival, and Mama Turns 100 (1979), which was nominated for the Academy Award for Best Foreign Language Film at the 52nd Academy Awards. "Mama Turns 100" was a sequel to Mr. Saura's Ana and the Wolves (1973), which Mr. Querejeta also produced.

Querejeta gave wings to the careers of directors such as Carlos Saura, Jaime Chávarri, Emilio Martínez Lázaro, Fernando León de Aranoa, Víctor Erice and his own daughter, Gracia Querejeta.

Personal life
The most significant relationship of Querejeta's life was with  Amparo Muñoz. He met Amparo on the set of Mamá cumple cien años. The relationship subsequently received much publicity. Querejeta remained married throughout their relationship; although he and his wife, Maria Carmen y Marin had been living separate lives, there was never an official split and neither party pursued a divorce. Muñoz did not interfere, and never fought for marriage, until her death in 2011. Querejeta later died in 2013 in Madrid, Spain, aged 78.

Notes

References

Further reading

External links 
 His life and Film Company
 
 

1934 births
2013 deaths
People from Hernani
Basque writers
Spanish film producers
Spanish male screenwriters
Spanish male writers
Spanish documentary filmmakers
Real Sociedad footballers
Spanish footballers
Footballers from the Basque Country (autonomous community)
Association football midfielders
La Liga players
Deportivo Alavés players
SD Eibar footballers
Segunda División players
Sportspeople from Gipuzkoa